Zastava (Serbo-Croatian and Slovene for "flag") may refer to:

Organizations 
 Zastava Arms
 Zastava Automobiles
 Zastava Special Automobiles
 Zastava TERVO, successor to Zastava Trucks

Places 
Zastava, Črnomelj, a small settlement in southeastern Slovenia